Daniel Scofield Earhart (May 28, 1907 –  January 2, 1976) was an American lawyer who served as a U.S. Representative from Ohio for two months from November 1936 to January 1937. He later served on active duty in both World War II and the Korean War.

Early life and career
Born in Columbus, Ohio, May 28, 1907, Earhart attended the public schools, and the College of Engineering of Ohio State University at Columbus.
He was graduated from the Moritz College of Law, Ohio State University, in 1928.
He was admitted to the bar the same year and commenced practice in Columbus, Ohio.

Special election and Congress
Earhart was elected as a Democrat to the Seventy-fourth Congress to fill the vacancy caused by the death of Charles V. Truax and served from November 3, 1936, to January 3, 1937.

Later career
He was not a candidate for election in 1936 to the Seventy-fifth Congress and resumed the practice of law.

Military service 
He served as member of the Officers' Reserve Corps 1928–1941.
Ordered to active service in the Infantry with rank of captain on May 26, 1941.
Transferred to the Army Air Forces with rank of major.
He was promoted to lieutenant colonel and was relieved of active duty on February 24, 1946.
Commissioned lieutenant colonel in the Ohio Air National Guard in 1948.
Recalled to active Federal military service September 2, 1951, and served until September 7, 1953, as commanding officer, deputy commander, and operations officer of the One Hundred and Fifty-fifth Tactical Control Group, United States Air Force, building up NATO tactical air control facilities in western Europe.

Retirement and death 
After leaving the military, he returned to Columbus, Ohio, where resumed the practice of law.

He died there on January 2, 1976.
Cremated.
Ashes interred in Green Lawn Cemetery.

Sources

1907 births
1976 deaths
United States Army Air Forces personnel of World War II
Burials at Green Lawn Cemetery (Columbus, Ohio)
Ohio lawyers
Ohio State University College of Engineering alumni
Ohio State University Moritz College of Law alumni
Politicians from Columbus, Ohio
United States Air Force colonels
United States Army Air Forces officers
Democratic Party members of the United States House of Representatives from Ohio
20th-century American lawyers
20th-century American politicians
Lawyers from Columbus, Ohio
Ohio National Guard personnel